Bucephala may refer to:
 Bucephala (bird), the goldeneye, a duck genus
 Bucephala is the name of at least two cities:
 Bucephala, or Alexandria Bucephalus, a city in Punjab founded by Alexander the Great and named in honor of his horse, Bucephalus
 Bucephala Acra, a city located on a promontory near Troezen in the Argolid

See also
 Bucephalus (disambiguation)

Taxonomy disambiguation pages